Goh Sin Tub was a well-known pioneer of Singaporean literature. He was a prolific writer of numerous book titles, which includes bestsellers like The Nan-Mei-Su Girls of Emerald Hill, The Ghost Lover of Emerald Hill, and the Ghosts of Singapore. He also wrote a collection of short stories in Malay.

Background
Goh was born in 1927 a second-generation Singapore-born Hokkien Chinese to a family of five siblings. His father was a clerk in the Yokohama Specie Bank (the former Hong Kong and Shanghai Bank) at Clifford Pier while his mother was a housewife. Three generations had lived on 104 Telok Ayer Street for most of their lives, before relocating to River Valley Road. He had primary education at the Royal English School in the River Valley vicinity, and went on to the St. Joseph's Institution together with his eldest brother, Charlie Goh.

In 1935 Goh attended the prestigious boys' school Raffles Institution. When the Japanese began bombing Singapore at the early stage of their invasion, the Goh family hid under a staircase at the back of their house at Emerald Hill. To avoid further bombing, the family later moved to a shophouse in Philip Road. He was a 14-year-old boy at the time of the Occupation.

As a youth, he sold bread and canned goods door to door and a coal worker carrying bags of coal to support his family during the Japanese Occupation. As he was fearful of the Japanese soldiers, he had to learn to be streetwise, and to size people up quickly in order to survive, and make money to support his family. He continued his education at St Joseph's Institution. Goh also won a scholarship to study at the prestigious Raffles College (a predecessor of the National University of Singapore) and graduated with a BA in English.

Career
After graduation, Goh returned to SJI to teach and founded the Youth Circle Poetry interest group at the school, which attracted and encouraged aspiring writers to meet regularly to discuss about writing poetry. Among his former protégés from the club was Edwin Thumboo, who would go on to become a prominent poet and writer in his own right.

In his lifetime he was also a civil servant, serving as deputy secretary to the Permanent Secretary of the Ministry of Health between 1951 - 1969. Moving on from the Ministry, he went into banking as a project management director, and was instrumental to the building of the OCBC Centre and the Dynasty Hotel/Tangs Complex. He also was a social worker and served as chairman of the Board of Governors for the St. Joseph's Institution. He also served on positions on a number of committees of various private and governmental organizations in Singapore. In 1992 Goh, along with Mrs Hedwig Anuar, was appointed to the 69-member Publications Advisory Panel by the Minister for Information and the Arts, to advise approvals and classification of publications referred to them by the Film Censors Board and the Ministry.

Bibliography

Novels
 The Nan-Mei-Su Girls of Emerald Hill (1989, Heinemann Writing in Asia Series; 1998, Raffles as The Girls of Emerald Hill)

Short story collections
 The Battle of the Bands and Other Stories (1986, MPH Magazines; 1987, Heinemann Writing in Asia Series as Honour and Other Stories; 1998, Raffles as Honour and Other Stories)   
 The Ghost Lover Of Emerald Hill And Other Stories (1987, Heinemann Writing in Asia Series; 1998, Raffles)  
 Ghosts of Singapore! (1990, Heinemann Writing in Asia Series; 1998, Raffles)  
 More Ghosts of Singapore! (1991, Heinemann Writing in Asia Series; 1998, Raffles)  
 The Sin-Kheh (1993, Times Books International) 
 Moments in a Singapore Life (1993, UniPress) 
 Goh's 12 Best Singapore Stories (1993, Heinemann Writing in Asia Series; 1998, Raffles)  
 Mass Possession: A True Story! Tales of the Supernatural and Natural (1994, Heinemann Writing in Asia Series; 1998, Raffles as The Campus Spirit and Other Stories)  
 "If You Too Could Do Voodoo, Who Would You Do Voodoo To?" and Other Stories (1995, Times Books International) 
 Loves of Sons and Daughters (1995, Times Books International) 
 30 Stories: Narrative Compositions for O-level (1996, EPB Publishers) 
 12 Women and Their Stories (1997, Times Books International) 
 One Singapore: 65 Stories by a Singaporean (1998, 2000, EPB Publishers)  
 One Singapore 2: 65 More Stories by a Singaporean (2000, EPB Publishers) 
 Goh Sin Tub's One Singapore 3: More Singaporean Stories (2001, SNP Pan Pacific Publishing) 
 Walk Like A Dragon: Short Stories (2004, Angsana Books) 
 The Angel of Changi & Other Stories (2005, Angsana Books)

Anthologies
 Robert Yeo, ed. Singapore Short Stories (1978, Heinemann Writing in Asia Series) 
 Helen Lee, ed. Tapestry: A Collection of Short Stories (1992, Heinemann Writing in Asia Series) 
 Kirpal Singh, ed. Rhythms: A Singaporean millennial anthology of poetry (2000, National Arts Council (Singapore)) 
 Gwee Li Sui, ed. Written Country: The History of Singapore through Literature (2016, Landmark Publications)

Children's
 Rhymes for Malaysian Children (1964, Malaysia Publications)

References

Infopedia, Biography Abstract (National Library Board)

1927 births
2004 deaths
Singaporean people of Hokkien descent
Saint Joseph's Institution, Singapore alumni
Singaporean writers